Martha Manning (born August 18, 1952) is an American writer, clinical psychologist and former professor of psychology at George Mason University.

Bibliography (selection)

References 

1952 births
Living people
American clinical psychologists
20th-century American women writers
21st-century American writers
20th-century American non-fiction writers
21st-century American non-fiction writers